Tal Aizik (Hebrew: טל אייזיק), better known as Fly, is an Israeli professional Dota 2 player for Evil Geniuses. He is a former co-founder of the esports team OG. Aizik won four Dota Major Championships with team OG.

Career
Coming from iLx along with N0tail and NoVa, Aizik took over the drafter role in Fnatic HoN squad. Being one of the longest serving members of Fnatic HoN squad, he switched with the team to Dota 2. Fly and n0tail left fnatic in August 2014. Tal played the offlane role for Team Secret, joining them along with BigDaddy. Tal and n0tail were separated at the end of 2014, when Aizik left Secret. They were re-united after The International 2015 in order to create a new team.

He founded OG on October 31, 2015. Soon after their renaming to OG, they won the Frankfurt Major tournament in November 2015, winning around US$1 million in prize money. Despite a 7th-place finish at the Shanghai Major in March 2016, OG won the Manila Major in June 2016, becoming the first team to repeat as champions of a Valve-sponsored Dota 2 tournament. OG also won the lesser ESL One Frankfurt 2016 tournament.

OG entered The International 2016 as one of the favorites, but finished 9-12th out of 16 teams. On August 24, 2016, founding members MoonMeander, Miracle- Al-Barkawi, and Cr1t- Nielsen left the team, but Fly remained. On August 31, 2016, s4, JerAx, and ana joined the team.

He is the son of the Krav Maga instructor Moni Aizik. Tal has done instructor courses and has an active interest in Krav Maga himself. He says that if he were not a professional Dota 2 player, he would be a Krav Maga teacher. In May 2018, he left OG to join Evil Geniuses, along with s4.

References

OG (esports) players
Evil Geniuses players
Dota players
Israeli esports players
Living people
CompLexity Gaming players
Team Secret players
Fnatic players
Year of birth missing (living people)